(The chased water) is a 1947 Dutch non-fiction novel written by A. den Doolaard, which gives an account of the recovery works to repair dike breaches after the October 1944 Inundation of Walcheren as part of operations by The Allies of World War II during Operation Infatuate. Researchers from Delft University of Technology have found high levels of historical accuracy in den Doolaard's descriptions of the events that took place, the methods used to close the dikes and the key people involved. Den Doolaard assigned pseudonyms to most of the main characters and organisations. The name A. den Doolaard is also a pseudonym, the author’s real name being Cornelis Johannes George Spoelstra Jr.

Context
In October 1944, several dikes surrounding the Dutch island of Walcheren were bombed by the Allies at strategic locations including Westkapelle, Vlissingen, and Fort Rammekens in order to deliberately flood the island. The bombings created major gaps in the dikes at four primary locations, breaching the coastal defences against The North Sea and allowing seawater to flow unchecked into inhabited areas of land. Whilst the bombings achieved the immediate military objective of forcing a retreat of the occupying forces of Nazi Germany, who had used Walcheren to control the Western Scheldt and access to The Port of Antwerp, the subsequent flooding caused by the breaches had profound effects on the island infrastructure and local population.

The novel describes the subsequent efforts to repair the breaches in the dikes and reclaim Walcheren from the sea. The works were completed by a number of Dutch contractors, including some with appropriate previous experience from the Zuiderzee works. 

Difficulties in commencing the rehabilitation works included the fact that many dredgers were still located in areas of the occupied Netherlands, and around 25% of the Dutch dredging fleet had been confiscated and transported to Germany.  Works at the main breach locations were divided up between four contractors as shown in the table below.

By October 1945, the contractors and Rijkswaterstaat had managed to assemble a fleet of 14 suction dredgers and bucket dredgers, 135 barges, 61 tugboats, 73 landing craft, 19 floating cranes, 52 bulldozers and draglines along with motor vehicles and other equipment. Difficulties in sourcing adequate materials and the sheer scale of the works during an emergency wartime situation led to innovative use of improvised materials and equipment, such as the Phoenix caissons used in the closure of the dike gaps, which had previously been used as Mulberry harbours during the Allied invasion of Normandy. Den Doolaard describes the initial reluctance of some of the contractors to use these units; however, their implementation was so successful that similar units would later be used on the closure of the Brielse Maasdam in 1950 and the Braakman in 1952.

Editions
The original Dutch edition of Het verjaagde water appeared in 1947, published by Em. Querido's Uitgeverij in Amsterdam. It was reprinted in 1958 by the same publisher. An updated edition with annotations by Professor K. d'Angremond and GJ Schiereck was published by Delft Academic Press in 2001. The book has also been translated into a number of languages, including  German, Danish, Swedish, Norwegian, Serbian, French, Czech and Hungarian.

Content
Both the original 1947 publication and the subsequent 1948 English translation by Barrows Mussey consist of five books and twenty-five chapters. The table below gives the title of each chapter, from both the Dutch and English versions.

Barrows Mussey's 1948 English translation uses literal translations of each chapter from the original Dutch, with the exception of chapter 19 which uses The joker with the idea as a translation of the Dutch term , a term used to describe a peddler tradesperson who sharpens knives. Den Doolaard uses  in a pejorative sense. The chapter title refers to the character Berend Bonkelaar's use of the term to express his incredulity at a particular method put forward for carrying out the dike repair works by an officer of Supreme Headquarters Allied Expeditionary Force. 

In chapters 9 and 17, Anton Hijnssen's surname is translated as Hynssen, with the Dutch IJ (digraph) being anglicised to Y.

Historical accuracy

For the 2001 reissue of the book, professor Kees D'Angremond and his colleague Gerrit-Jan Schiereck from Delft University of Technology undertook eight years of research around the characters in the book and the events described in it, with two of their graduate students investigating the accuracy of den Doolaard's representation of the technical aspects of the Walcheren reclamation. Their findings were included as annotations in the book and confirmed the high levels of accuracy in den Doolaard's descriptions of the people, events and technical aspects of the hydraulic engineering methods implemented, including the use of caissons, Phoenix breakwaters and torpedo nets.

The true identities of many of the characters in the novel were revealed by the research, with biographical details added as appendices to the 2001 edition. The characters included den Doolard's depiction of protagonists such as the distinguished civil engineer and professor,  (represented by the character Van Hummel), many senior Rijkswaterstaat officials, the charismatic dredging boss Berend Bonkelaar (den Doolaard's psuedonym for J.J. 'Kobus' Kalis, a founding director of the Boskalis company), and Klaas Otterkop, the pseudonym of fascine mattress construction foreman Gerrit Visser of Gebroeders Van Oord, who supervised the installation of 36 fascine mattresses over a total area of 52,700 square metres during the work. The table below provides information on many of the characters and organisations in the novel arising from d'Angremond and Schiereck's research.

Bibliography
 Het verjaagde water (1947) Netherlands: Em. Querido's Uitgeverij, Amsterdam.
--- (1958) Em. Querido's Uitgeverij, Amsterdam.
--- (2001) VSSD/Delft Academic Press, with new research and annotations by Prof. ir. K. d'Angremond and ir. G.J. Schiereck.

 Roll back the sea (1948) United States: Simon and Schuster, New York, translated by Barrows Mussey.

See also 
 Netherlands in World War II
 Operation Infatuate
 Flood control in the Netherlands
 Zuiderzee Works
 Rijkswaterstaat
 Henry Hay (writer)

References

External links
Oral history interview with Major Allan Beckett An oral history interview with Allan Beckett from 1997, conducted by the Imperial War Museum, in which he discusses his experiences in Walcheren.

1947 non-fiction books
Books about the Netherlands
Floods in the Netherlands
History of Zeeland